Nemapogon gravosaellus is a moth of the family Tineidae. It is found in Austria, the Czech Republic, Slovakia, Italy, Croatia, Serbia, Romania, Bulgaria, Hungary, North Macedonia, Greece and Ukraine, as well as on Sardinia, Sicily, the Dodecanese Islands and Crete.

The wingspan is about 12 mm.

References

Moths described in 1957
Nemapogoninae